Torey Jamal Thomas, (born February 26, 1985) is an American professional basketball player for ADA Blois Basket 41 of the LNB Pro B.

High school and college career
Thomas attended Trinity Catholic High School in Stamford, Connecticut. He played college basketball at the College of the Holy Cross. In his four-year career with the Holy Cross Crusaders, he played 125 games, averaging 9.6 points, 4.1 rebounds, 3.7 assists and 2.1 steals per game.

Professional career
Thomas averaged 25.6 points, 7.6 rebounds, 6.6 assists and 3.1 steals per game for Akropol in his first season as professional player. Later he was named the Player of the Year in the Swedish Basketligan.

Thomas signed one-year contract in July 2008 with Hanzevast Capitals of the Netherlands. After finished season, Thomas remained in the same league, this time he signed with Matrixx Magixx.

On July 12, 2010, Thomas signed with PGE Turow. Playing for Turów Zgorzelec, Thomas averaged 14.4 points, 4.2 rebounds and 5.7 assists per game over 41 games. At the end of the season, he was named MVP of the Polish Basketball League.

In August 2011, he signed with the Russian club Spartak Primorye, alongside future teammate Jekeel Akindele.

On September 3, 2012, Thomas agreed to sign a one-year contract with Partizan Belgrade. On November 15, 2012, he parted ways with Partizan. On December 22, 2012, he signed with Scavolini Pesaro for the rest of the season.

On June 22, 2013, Thomas signed one-year deal with Aliağa Petkim. He was released on October 22, 2013. In December 2013, he signed with Le Mans. He left them in January 2014, and signed with Cholet Basket. On April 2, 2014, he parted ways with Cholet.

On August 23, 2014, he signed a one-year deal with Aris Thessaloniki.

On July 7, 2015, Thomas signed with Rosa Radom of the Polish Basketball League.

On September 10, 2016, Thomas signed with Macedonian club MZT Skopje for the 2016–17 season. On October 10, 2016, he parted ways with MZT after appearing in only three ABA league games. Two days later he signed with Petrolina AEK Larnaca for the rest of the season.

On July 24, 2017, Thomas signed a one-year deal with French club ADA Blois Basket 41 of the LNB Pro B.

Statistics

College statistics

References

External links
 Torey Thomas at ESPN.com
 Official website
 Torey Thomas at fiba.com
 

1985 births
Living people
ABA League players
ADA Blois Basket 41 players
AEK Larnaca B.C. players
African-American basketball players
Aliağa Petkim basketball players
American expatriate basketball people in Cyprus
American expatriate basketball people in the Dominican Republic
American expatriate basketball people in France
American expatriate basketball people in Greece
American expatriate basketball people in Italy
American expatriate basketball people in the Netherlands
American expatriate basketball people in North Macedonia
American expatriate basketball people in Poland
American expatriate basketball people in Russia
American expatriate basketball people in Serbia
American expatriate basketball people in Sweden
American expatriate basketball people in Turkey
American expatriate basketball people in Venezuela
American men's basketball players
Aris B.C. players
Basketball players from New York (state)
BC Spartak Primorye players
Cholet Basket players
Donar (basketball club) players
Dutch Basketball League players
Guaros de Lara (basketball) players
Holy Cross Crusaders men's basketball players
KK MZT Skopje players
KK Partizan players
Le Mans Sarthe Basket players
Matrixx Magixx players
People from White Plains, New York
Point guards
Rosa Radom players
Sportspeople from Westchester County, New York
Turów Zgorzelec players
Victoria Libertas Pallacanestro players
21st-century African-American sportspeople
20th-century African-American people